The scrub greenlet or  scrub vireo (Hylophilus flavipes) is a small passerine bird in the vireo family. It breeds in Costa Rica, Panama, Colombia, Venezuela and Tobago. They can be found in the southernmost part of Central America and northern South America, which can be defined as extending from Venezuela to Colombia.

Habitat 
Scrub greenlets inhabit forest edges, savanna, and light woodland areas of lower sea level.

Appearance 
The adult scrub greenlet is 11.5 cm long and weighs 13 g. It is mainly green on the upperparts, with brighter wings and rump, and an olive-brown head with very weak supercilium and yellowish eyering. The underparts are yellow, the bill is mainly dark and the legs are pale. The call is a long series of notes, weary-weary-weary-weary, interspersed with churrs and squeaks. Both males and females have similar appearance, and they are often spotted in pairs.

Behavior 
They build a deep cup nest suspended from a tree branch. A typical scrub greenlet's clutch consists of three white eggs, which are marked with brown. While current population size is unknown, it is not believed to be diminishing, so the species is evaluated as Least Concern.

They are known to hang upside-down to forage for food. Scrub greenlets feed on insects and spiders taken from the upper and middle levels of tree foliage. They also eat berries, especially before migration. Scrub greenlets are also known to occasionally join mixed species flocks. A mixed feeding flock is used by foraging birds to increase feeding efficiency and form protection from predators. Mixed species flocks tend to be larger in the tropics compared to temperate rainforests, but remains a phenomenon that has puzzled researchers for a long time.

Taxonomy 
There are currently seven recognized subspecies of scrub greenlets. They are sorted into two groups: Central American and Southern American. The first group, the scrub greenlet (yellow-green), is a subspecies found in Central America, and it is known as conspecific with H. flavipes. These scrub greenlets have dark yellow underparts and bright green upperparts. This group encompasses two subspecies: Hylophilus flavipes viridiflavus and Hylophilus flavipes xuthus. H. flavipes viridiflavus has been sighted in Southwestern Costa Rica, Panama, and on the Pacific coast, east to the lower Bayano River. H. flavipes xuthus is similar to H. flavipes viridiflavus but it is less yellow in color, has darker green flanks and upperparts, and has a heavier bill. It has been sighted on Coiba Island.  

The second group, scrub greenlet (scrub) is the grouping of subspecies found in South America, and it is known as conspecific with H. viridiflavus and H. insularis. It encompasses four subspecies:
 H. flavipes is found in northern and central Colombia. It can be identified by its dull olive green coloring and slightly brighter rump, black and gray flight feathers, and a whitish gray chin and chest.
 H. flavipes melleus is found in extreme northern Colombia. It is similar in color to the nominate subspecies, but the crown and back are darker with less yellow underparts.
 H. flavipes galbanus is typically found in northern and eastern Colombia. It can be identified by its whiter colored abdomen compared to the nominate species, and it's white irises.
 H. flavipes acuticaudus is found in Northern Venezuela. It is duller in color compared to the nominate subspecies.

The third grouping of scrub greenlets is the scrub greenlet (Tobago) and it includes one subspecies: H. insularis. It is found in Tobago and is larger than the nominate subspecies.

 References 

 Further reading 

 A guide to the birds of Costa Rica'' by Stiles and Skutch 

scrub greenlet
Birds of Costa Rica
Birds of Panama
Birds of Colombia
Birds of Venezuela
Birds of Trinidad and Tobago
scrub greenlet